Sharchop may refer to:
Sharchop people
Sharchop language